SANASA Development Bank PLC, commonly called SDB bank, is a Sri Lankan bank serving the co-operative sector, founded in 1997. This bank has opened 94 branches in Sri Lanka. In 1997 SDB Bank was granted the status of Licensed Specialized Bank by the Central Bank of Sri Lanka.

Subsidiaries 

 Sdbl North East Construction Company Pvt Ltd
 Sanasa Development Bank Ltd
 Asset Management Arm

References

External links 
 Official website

Banks of Sri Lanka
Banks established in 1997
1997 establishments in Sri Lanka
Companies listed on the Colombo Stock Exchange